Live Tour 2009: Trick (stylized as Koda Kumi Live Tour 2009 ~TRICK~) is the tenth DVD by Japanese pop artist Koda Kumi. It charted at No. 1 on the Oricon Weekly charts and stayed on the charts for six weeks.

The limited editions came with a holographic cover and a bonus DVD.

The DVD is certified Gold for shipment of 100,000 copies.

Information
Live Tour 2009 ~Trick~ is Japanese singer-songwriter Kumi Koda's tenth DVD release and sixth concert DVD. The DVD charted at No. 1 on Oricon, continuing her streak of number-one concert releases, which began in 2005 with Secret First Class Limited Live, and remained on the charts for twenty-nine weeks. Live Tour 2009 ~Trick~ had been certified Gold for over 100,000 being shipping, according to the Recording Industry Association of Japan.

The DVD was released as both a regular edition and a limited edition. Limited editions contained a bonus DVD with extra features, including the behind-the-scenes footage of the tour along with the rehearsals, and performances which featured artists Fergie, AK-69 and Kumi's younger sister, misono. These were performances filmed outside of the tour filmed for the DVD. The video featuring misono was a digest of all the performances misono took part in for the tour alongside her sister. 

Live Tour 2009 ~Trick~ would later be one of the concerts released a musical CD for a limited time in 2012.

Track list
(Source)

DVD1
0. "Opening Movie"
"Trick" 
"Taboo"
"Driving"
"show girl / BUT / Cutie Honey / Koi no Tsubomi / D.D.D. / show girl"
"Shake It"<Interlude Movie 1>
"Hurry Up!"
"That Ain't Cool"
"Ecstasy"
"Your Love"
"Moon Crying"
"Bling Bling Bling"<Interlude Movie 2>
"stay with me"
"you"
"Always"
"This is not a love song"<Interlude Movie 3>
"Winter Bell"
"Just The Way You Are / Venus / Lady Go!"
"Joyful"<Encore>
"Sweet Kiss / Ai no Uta / Someday / Sora / Love Holic / Won't Be Long / Butterfly / It's All Love!
"Hashire!"
"Lick me♥"
"walk"

DVD2: Bonus Footage
"Behind-the-Scenes and Making of the Tour"
"Special Guest Artist Collaboration"
"It's all Love! feat. misono" (Digest Video)
"Bling Bling Bling feat. AK-69" (2009.05.08 @Nippon Gaishi Hall)
"That Ain't Cook feat. Fergie" (2009.05.31 @Yoyogi National Gymnasium)

References

2009 video albums
Koda Kumi video albums
Live video albums